The Naiste Meistriliiga Player of the Year is an annual award given to the best Naiste Meistriliiga player for her performances in the league.

Winners

References

External links
Official website 

 
Estonia 1F
Lists of Estonian sportspeople
Estonian sports trophies and awards
Association football player non-biographical articles